Óscar González Yáñez (born 6 October 1964) is a Mexican politician from the Labor Party. He served as Deputy of the LIX and LXI Legislatures of the Mexican Congress representing the State of Mexico. He also served as a local deputy in the LIV Legislature of the Congress of the State of Mexico.

References

1964 births
Living people
Politicians from Mexico City
Labor Party (Mexico) politicians
21st-century Mexican politicians
National Autonomous University of Mexico alumni
20th-century Mexican politicians
Members of the Congress of the State of Mexico
Deputies of the LXI Legislature of Mexico
Members of the Chamber of Deputies (Mexico) for the State of Mexico